Twinkie the Kid is the mascot for Twinkies, Hostess's golden cream-filled snack cakes. He is a registered trademark of Hostess Brands.  He made his debut in 1971. He has appeared on product packaging, in commercials and as related collectible merchandise, except for a brief period between 1988 and 1990.

Description
Twinkie the Kid is an anthropomorphized Twinkie appearing as a wrangler. He wears boots, gloves, a kerchief with hearts, and a ten-gallon hat with the words "Twinkie the Kid" on the band. He was created by Denny Lesser, a route delivery driver for Hostess in the San Fernando Valley, CA. He designed the mascot and his wife made the costume that he used for a traveling promotional campaign.

Animated commercial appearances 

The character appeared in animated TV advertisements for Twinkies in the 1970s, voiced by Allen Swift.

See also
Captain Cupcake
Chauncey Chocodile
Fruit Pie the Magician

Notes

Cartoon mascots
Food advertising characters
Male characters in advertising
Fictional food characters
Fictional cowboys and cowgirls
Hostess Brands
Mascots introduced in 1971